Stojaković is a Serbian surname that may refer to

Đorđe Stojaković (1810–1863), Serbian political activist, lawyer and a revolutionary
Igor Stojaković (born 1980), Serbian football player 
Jadranka Stojaković (born 1950), Serbian singer-songwriter 
Nenad Stojaković (born 1980), Serbian football midfielder
Peja Stojaković (born 1977), Serbian basketball player

See also
Stojanović, a surname
Stojković, a surname

Serbian surnames